Richard Fidler is an Australian radio presenter and writer, best known for his hour-long interview program, Conversations with Richard Fidler on ABC's Radio National, and as a former member of the Australian comedy group the Doug Anthony All Stars. Conversations  consists of in-depth interviews with local and international guests from all walks of life, and has been very popular as a podcast.

Career

Fidler came to prominence in the 1980s as a member of the Doug Anthony All Stars (DAAS), an Australian musical comedy group also comprising Tim Ferguson and Paul McDermott. The guitar Fidler used often during his time with the DAAS was a black Yamaha APX 9-12 tuned to D standard; however he did use a metallic green 6 string acoustic in standard tuning in a couple of songs on Live at the National Theatre (New York) and used a generic electric guitar in a cover of "Anarchy in the U.K." on The Big Gig. That guitar was in standard tuning. On DAAS Icon, the bulk of the album was recorded with an electric guitar in standard tuning; however, some songs featured the APX 9-12. The group disbanded in 1994.

Fidler began his broadcast career on TV and presented shows including Race Around the World, Aftershock, Mouthing Off and Vulture.

In 2001, he was elected to the national committee of the Australian Republican Movement and was the chair of their Constitutional Issues committee. He resigned from these positions in 2007.

In 2005, Fidler moved to Brisbane, Queensland, to host the 7pm to 10pm shift on ABC Local Radio station 612 ABC Brisbane. The following year, he took on the newly configured 11am to 3pm shift on 612 ABC. The first hour, a long-form interview program known as Conversations, was also heard on 702 ABC Sydney. Since 2012 Fidler has focused solely on Conversations. '

Conversations is broadcast each weekday on ABC Local Radio in all Australian states except Victoria, and on ABC Radio National. It has over many years been one of the top five most downloaded podcasts in Australia, according to iTunes charts. In 2018, the program's name changed to Conversations and former Radio National arts journalist Sarah Kanowski joined Fidler as a regular host. The two presenters share duties, with Fidler usually presenting on Monday to Wednesday and Kanowski on Thursday and Friday.

In 2011, Fidler was awarded a Churchill Fellowship to investigate new forms of public radio in the United States and the United Kingdom.

Saga Land, written with Kari Gislason (ABC Books, 2019) was shortlisted for the NSW Premier's Literary Awards, Douglas Stewart Prize for non-Fiction.

Fidler is the immediate past-president of Brisbane's Institute of Modern Art (IMA) and a member of its board of directors.

The Golden Maze was shortlisted for the General nonfiction book of the year at the 2021 Australian Book Industry Awards. The Book of Roads and Kingdoms was shortlisted for the Nonfiction prize at the 2023 Indie Book Awards.

Personal life 
Fidler is married to Khym Lam and they have two children.

Published works 
 Doug Anthony Allstars, namely: 
 Doug Anthony Allstars, namely:

Appearances 
Fidler was scheduled to appear in two events at the 2017 Brisbane Writers Festival in Brisbane, Queensland, Australia.

Fidler was also the presenter of the annual 2018 Seymour Biography Lecture at the National Library of Australia, speaking to the topic "Telling and writing the story".

References

External links
 
 
 
 Conversations website

Year of birth missing (living people)
Living people
Australian male comedians
ABC radio (Australia) journalists and presenters
People from Brisbane
Australian republicans
Australian television presenters
Australian buskers
Australian podcasters
Australian satirists